Noosha Fox (born Susan Traynor, 8 December 1944) is an Australian singer. She is known as the lead singer of the band Fox, who had three UK chart hits in 1975 and 1976. She also had a number 31 hit as a solo performer with "Georgina Bailey".

Career
Susan Traynor was born in Australia in 1944. She began her music career as a singer in Sydney-based folk rock band Wooden Horse, who moved to England in 1970 and released two LPs. After the band split up, she provided background vocals on American singer and songwriter Kenny Young's 1973 solo album, Last Stage For Silverworld. 

She then joined Fox, the band formed by Young and Northern Irish singer-songwriter Herbie Armstrong. She adopted the stage name Noosha, a corruption of an anagram of her first name (nussa), and in performances wore dresses and accessories in 1920s and 1930s style. With Fox, Noosha achieved three top 20 hits on the UK Singles Chart: "Only You Can" and "Imagine Me, Imagine You" in 1975 and "S-S-S-Single Bed" in 1976. She left after their third album, Blue Hotel, to launch a solo career. Her first single, "Georgina Bailey", written and produced by Young, briefly entered the Top 40 in the UK Singles Chart, reaching number 31 in 1977.

In 1979, Noosha Fox tried to restart her solo career with a single, "The Heat Is On", written by Florrie Palmer and Tony Ashton, on Chrysalis Records. A later version of the song, by ABBA's Agnetha Fältskog, was a European hit four years later. In 1980, Fox provided guest vocals for the songs "Perfect Strangers" and "Havana Moon" on Tim Renwick's self-titled debut album.

Fox recorded several singles in the early 1980s for the Earlobe label but none were successful, and she withdrew from the music industry. Although she did not write her own songs, her performance style has been credited with influencing Kate Bush and Alison Goldfrapp. It was reported in 2007 on BBC Radio 4's The Music Group that Fox was recording a solo album of electropop but it has not been released.

On the 1st August 2022, renowned music producer Shel Talmy released a 5 track downloadable EP of original songs by Noosha that were recorded in 1978.

Personal life
Fox has been married since 1973 to physician and academic Michael Goldacre, with whom she has four children, one of whom is Ben Goldacre, a physician and academic best known for his "Bad Science" weekly column. Ben Goldacre announced that Fox was his mother after seeing her perform "S-S-S-Single Bed" on a BBC4 repeat of Top of the Pops, and stated that she was working on new material.

Discography

Source:

References

Australian women singers
Australian pop singers
Australian expatriates in the United Kingdom
Living people
1944 births